Homer Senior High School can refer to:

Homer Senior High School (Alaska) in Homer, Alaska
Homer Senior High School (New York) in Homer, New York